Anke Fuchs (5 July 1937 – 14 October 2019) was a German lawyer and politician of the Social Democratic Party of Germany. She was Federal Minister for Youth, Family and Health (1982) and Vice President of the Bundestag (1998–2002). From 2003 until 2010, she was the president of the Friedrich Ebert Foundation.

Life and career 

She was born Anke Nevermann in Hamburg, the daughter of Paul Nevermann who later became mayor of Hamburg, and his wife Grete. Her parents met at home politicians such as Herbert Wehner, Kurt Schumacher, Wilhelm Pieck and Otto Grotewohl. Her parents, both grandfathers and two brothers were party members of the Social Democratic Party (SPD). She joined the party's youth organisation (Falken) as a school student, and was active in demonstrations against atomic weapons. She became a party member in 1956, shortly before her Abitur. The same year, she began to study law, completing with the Zweites Staatsexamen in 1964. She then worked as Referentin für Arbeitsrecht und Sozialpolitik for Deutscher Gewerkschaftsbund (DGB) for the Nordmark district. She was member of the board of the IG Metall from 1971 to 1978.

In 1977, Fuchs was appointed Secretary of State in the Federal Ministry of Labour and Social Affairs by the then minister Herbert Ehrenberg. In 1979, she became a member of the board (Parteivorstand) of the SPD. She was elected to the Bundestag in 1980 as a candidate from the Cologne II district in North Rhine-Westphalia.

On 28 April 1982, Fuchs was appointed Federal Minister for Youth, Family and Health by Chancellor Helmut Schmidt. Following the election victory of the conservative opposition, she had to leave the cabinet on 4 October 1982. She was offered candidacy for minister-president in Lower Saxony in the 1980s, but declined in favour of Gerhard Schröder. In 1990, she was the SPD candidate for the position in Saxony, but the CDU with Kurt Biedenkopf won the election.

Fuchs was a member of the Bundestag until 2002. She was vice president of its SPD fraction from 1993 to 1998, and she served as Vice President of the Bundestag from 1998 to 2002. She focused on national and international political education, support of young scientists in international cooperation, and European politics for peace and social reforms. She was honorary president from 2010.

Fuchs was married and had two children. She died on 14 October 2019 after a long illness, at the age of 82.

Works

References

External links
 
 Anke Fuchs SPD
 

1937 births
2019 deaths
Health ministers of Germany
Members of the Bundestag for North Rhine-Westphalia
Members of the Bundestag 1994–1998
Members of the Bundestag 1990–1994
Members of the Bundestag 1987–1990
Members of the Bundestag 1983–1987
Members of the Bundestag 1980–1983
Members of the Hamburg Parliament
Ministers for children, young people and families
Female members of the Bundestag
Grand Crosses with Star and Sash of the Order of Merit of the Federal Republic of Germany
Women federal government ministers of Germany
20th-century German women politicians
21st-century German women politicians
Members of the Bundestag for the Social Democratic Party of Germany